Allegheny County Airport Authority is a municipal authority in Allegheny County, Pennsylvania that oversees and maintains the Allegheny County airport system.  These include management of Pittsburgh International Airport as well as Allegheny County Airport.  The authority is also a key lobbying and public interest agency often representing the local aviation industry and related industry interests in Harrisburg (the state capital) and on the federal level.

The authority holds over $500 million in debt from construction of the Pittsburgh International Airport.

Directors of Pittsburgh International Airport
Christina Cassotis January 15, 2015 – present
James R. Gill March 14, 2014 – January 14, 2015 (interim)
Bradley Penrod October 2007 – February 5, 2013  (interim status until March 14, 2014)
Kent George December 14, 1998 – October 2007 (also served as president of the American Association of Airport Executives
Gary Bishop January 1996 – December 31, 1997
Peter Florian January 20, 1996 –
Herbert Higginbotham December 1993 – January 19, 1996
Guy Tumolo June 1993 – November 30, 1993
Scott O'Donnell January 1988 – June 1993
Stephen A. George pre-1988
David Donohoe circa 1981–1982
Martin J. Griffin, 1968 – 1971 
Clifford Ball, April 23, 1952 (opening) – October 1955.

References

External links
 Allegheny County Airport Authority homepage
Pittsburgh International Airport homepage
Allegheny County Airport homepage

County airports in Pennsylvania
Municipal authorities in Pennsylvania
Government of Allegheny County, Pennsylvania